Ectoedemia alnifoliae is a moth of the family Nepticulidae. It is found in the Troödos mountains on Cyprus, Greece (Samos) and southern Turkey.

The wingspan is about 6.6 mm. Adults are on wing in April. There is one generation per year.

The larvae feed on Quercus alnifolia and Quercus coccifera. They mine the leaves of their host plant. The mine consists of a narrow, much contorted, corridor that widens into a large blotch against the leaf margin.

External links
Fauna Europaea
bladmineerders.nl
A Taxonomic Revision Of The Western Palaearctic Species Of The Subgenera Zimmermannia Hering And Ectoedemia Busck s.str. (Lepidoptera, Nepticulidae), With Notes On Their Phylogeny

Nepticulidae
Moths of Europe
Moths of Asia
Moths described in 1985